Mark Simpkin (born 18 September 1972, Ashton, Cheshire) is an English television presenter and an entrepreneur with a diverse business portfolio encompassing product supply and distribution, property development, luxury travel business and England’s largest private natural burial ground.

Lockers & Furniture
Simpkin began his career selling Lockers and changing room equipment to public and private sector clients. His “Simply Group” products now include the UK's widest range of Locker specifications, cupboards, shelving and other storage products as well as a wide range of specialist café furniture, cycle/smoking shelters and walkways. Customers include Kurt Geiger, UGG Australia, Westfield Shopping Centre, Rothchilds, Buckingham Palace, Strictly Come Dancing and BBC1 EastEnders.

Property
Simpkin's property portfolio includes completed complex projects in conservation, greenbelt, and protected areas. Projects completed include a large former gamekeepers cottage and a significant barn and farmhouse conversion in the Cheshire plains.

Simpkin's company also obtained planning permission to develop the local St Johns Church in Bollington in to 13 apartments. It was originally set to be completed in 2018 but continued economic downturn and the covid pandemic led to the site falling into disrepair.  A new planning application has been submitted in 2022.

Most recently Simpkin obtained planning permission for England's largest private natural burial ground in Adlington, Cheshire, in conjunction with the historic Adlington Hall estate. This opened in Autumn 2016 and serves surrounding parishes and all faiths with burial and cremated remains plots in response to the significant shortage in more traditional Churchyards and crematoriums.

Travel
Simpkin set up "Simply Luxury Travel", with his wife Tricia Penrose specialising in luxury holidays for footballer, celebrity and high net worth clients. The company won "The Cruise Club" 'highest selling newcomer to cruise' award in their first year.

Media
Simpkin was a presenter for an ITV1 programme called I Want That House, about buying property abroad. He presented over 100 shows, including 15 live shows from Florida. He presented GMTV's Fashion Police and LK Today, and ITV's This Morning, where he presented a property segment called Property Police. He also presented regular reports from around the world for BBC1's Holiday.

Having missed out on a place in boy band Take That, he went into acting, appearing in ITV1's long-running soap Coronation Street as the character Craig Brennan.

Simpkin had roles in Zig Zag, an educational children's series on BBC2, a live reporter on the youth show The Totally Friday Show, the Travel Channel, Carlton Food Network, Manchester United TV and the Granada Regional Newsroom, where he trained.

Simpkin hosted a nationwide series of youth conferences with Sir Alan Sugar for Lloyds TSB. The road show promoted entrepreneurialism in Great Britain. He still works closely with local schools advising pupils interested in starting their own business.

Family
He was married to actress and singer Tricia Penrose. They have two sons, born in 2003 and 2008.  Tricia and Mark had a wedding renewal ceremony on their 10-year anniversary.

References

External links
 Simply Luxury Travel
 Adlington Memorial Park
 Simply Lockers
 Simply Tables & Chairs

English businesspeople
English television presenters
1970 births
Living people